Love Cuisine is a 2015 Taiwanese romance, comedy drama television series produced by Sanlih E-Television, starring Lego Lee, Allison Lin, Duncan Chow and Nita Lei as the main cast. Filming began on July 13, 2015 and will be filmed as it airs. First original broadcast began August 7, 2015 on SETTV channel airing every Friday nights at 10:00-11:30 pm.

Synopsis
Things get hot in the kitchen when Oscar Han (Lego Lee), a lively young chef, starts mixing up trouble under the nose of disciplined Chef Fang Xiao Rou (Allison Lin). But as these complete opposites struggle to create mesmerizing meals, they eventually discover that cooking with gas requires more than technical skills and bravado. In fact, romance just may be the secret ingredient Oscar and Xiao Rou have been searching for all along.

Cast

Main cast
Lego Lee as Han Jie （Oscar Han）
Allison Lin as Fang Xiao Rou 
Duncan Chow as Wen Zhen Yu 
 as Jiang Pei Ying

Supporting cast

 as Su Ying Jun
 as Li Zhi Chao 
Fu Lei as Han Jia Xiong 
 as Fang Ming Kai 
 as Ma Chong Sheng (Ah Sheng) 
Ben Wu as Wang Mai Zhi (Mai Zi) 
 as Liu Xuan 
Chen Jing Xuan as Fan Ai Mi （Amy）
Zhang Luo Ti as Tang Hao (Tang Xiao Niu) student cook who plays the "tough guy" role
Yi Guang as Kong Meng Zhe 
Huang Xin Hao as Li Ming Xiu 
Wu Ji Xuan as Fang Xiao Hua 
Qiao Ya Lin as Zhang Xuan Ya 
Lin Guan Ting as Qiang Na Sen 
 as Chen Meng Chen 
 as Wei Qi Zhen

Cameo

Qiu Long Jie as bar owner
Hu Pei Lian as Xu Man Fen 
Lung Shao-hua as an old man
Wang De Sheng as Old Chen
 as nurse
 as Boss Chen
Tsai Ming Xiu as organic gardening radishes' owner
 as Hao Mei Li 
 as Raymond
Lin Jia Wei as hotel's MC
Guo Tai Wang as Hakka stir fry restaurant's chef
 as stir fry restaurant's wine promoter
 as Chong Sheng's grandma 
Amanda Chou as Yao Xin Shi （Cindy Yao）
Zhao Bai Han as elementary school student
Zhang Yun Yun as MC
Ji Tian Yu as MC
Ba Zheng Kun as competition judges
Pan Wei Xiang as competition judges
 as competition judges
 as Lin Hui Mei
Guan Jin Zong as Boss Zhao
Chris Wang as Chris Yao
Wang Lei Zhen (Lei Lei)

Soundtrack
We Are Young 我們青春 by Dino Lee 李玉璽
Why Not Love? 怎麼還不愛 by Rosie Yang 楊凱琳 & Ryan Yu 余楓
SHOUT by Dino Lee 李玉璽
For You by Dino Lee 李玉璽
Love More by Bii 畢書盡
Stay 我不離開 by Princess Ai 戴愛玲 & A-Lin
Never Forget 不忘 by Rosie Yang 楊凱琳
You've Been In My Heart 你一直在心中 by Wu Mochou 吳莫愁

Broadcast

Episode ratings

Awards and nominations

References

External links
Love Cuisine SETTV Official website 
Love Cuisine ETTV Website 
Love Cuisine Official Facebook page 

2015 Taiwanese television series debuts
2016 Taiwanese television series endings
Sanlih E-Television original programming
Taiwanese romance television series
2010s high school television series
Cooking television series